The Ruhr Open was a minor-ranking snooker tournament, which was part of the Players Tour Championship. The tournament was staged from 2013 to 2015 at the RWE-Sporthalle in Mülheim, Germany. Rory McLeod was the final champion.

Winners

See also
 2010 Ruhr Championship

References

 
Recurring sporting events established in 2013
2013 establishments in Germany
Players Tour Championship
Snooker minor-ranking tournaments
Snooker competitions in Germany
Sport in Mülheim